Charles, Margrave of Burgau, also known as Charles of Austria, (22 November 1560 at Křivoklát Castle in Bohemia – 30 October 1618 in Überlingen), was the son of Archduke Ferdinand II of Austria and his first morganatic marriage to Philippine Welser. He was the brother of Andrew of Austria.

Biography 
Charles of Burgau pursued a military career.  He unsuccessfully led a Spanish regiment in the war against the Netherlands and was then deployed in the Long War against the Ottoman Empire.  Here, he recorded some successes — at the expense of his soldiers, who were hungry and unpaid; some of them deserted — and was promoted to Field Marshal.

His father died in 1595.  Since Charles was born from a morganatic marriage, he was not entitled to inherit the archduchy.  He was, however, amply compensated financially and given some territories.  His most important possession was the Margraviate of Burgau.  He also held the Landgraviate of Nellenburg and the County of Hohenberg.  Contemporary sources describe his magnificent court at his residence, Günzburg Castle.

Charles was not popular among his subjects, whom he forbade to drink wheat beer.  Nor was he popular among the noble residents of his margraviate, who included the Bishop of Augsburg, the Counts of Fugger and the free imperial cities of Ulm and Augsburg, and with whom he had conflict about tax increases and about their sovereign rights.

In 1615 or 1616, he founded a Capuchin monastery in Günzburg.  In 1617, he expelled the Jews from Günzburg; they were ordered to leave the city within a year.

Charles died on 30 October 1618.  In 1619, his body was transferred to the church of the Capuchin monastery in Günzburg.  His widow as also buried there, in 1627.  When the monastery was demolished in 1806, both bodies were transferred to St. Martin's church in Günzburg.

Marriage and issue 
In 1601, Charles married Sibylle (26 August 1557 – 1627), the daughter of Duke William of Jülich-Cleves-Berg.  This marriage remained childless, and after Charles's death, his possessions fell back to the main line of the House of Habsburg.

However, Charles had several children from extramarital affairs:
 With Chiara Elisa Isabella di Ferrero:
 Anna Elisabeth, Baroness of Hohenberg (* 1588, † 1621 in Vienna), married in 1607 Pietro Francesco di Ferrero, Marchese della Marmora († 1611)
 With an unknown woman:
 Charles, Baron of Hohenberg
 Ferdinand, Baron of Hohenberg

Ancestors

References 
 
 Franz Reißenauer: Günzburg — Geschichte einer schwäbischen Stadt, 2 vols, Wißner-Verlag, Augsburg, 2009, 
 Constantin von Wurzbach: Habsburg, Karl (Markgraf von Burgau), in: Biographisches Lexikon des Kaiserthums Oesterreich, vol. 6, Verlag L. C. Zamarski, Vienna, 1860, p. 364, Online

External links 
 Images of Charles at the Kunsthistorisches Museum in Vienna

Footnotes 

16th-century House of Habsburg
17th-century House of Habsburg
1560 births
1618 deaths
Margraves of Germany
16th-century German people
House of Welser
Sons of monarchs